Glipa bifasciata is a species of beetle in the genus Glipa. It was described in 1920.

References

bifasciata
Beetles described in 1920